Pole vaulting, also known as pole jumping, is a track and field event in which an athlete uses a long and flexible pole, usually made from fiberglass or carbon fiber, as an aid to jump over a bar. Pole jumping competitions were known to the Mycenaean Greeks, Minoan Greeks and Celts. It has been a full medal event at the Olympic Games since 1896 for men and since 2000 for women.

It is typically classified as one of the four major jumping events in athletics, alongside the high jump, long jump and triple jump. It is unusual among track and field sports in that it requires a significant amount of specialised equipment in order to participate, even at a basic level. A number of elite pole vaulters have had backgrounds in gymnastics, including world record breakers Yelena Isinbayeva and Brian Sternberg, reflecting the similar physical attributes required for the sports. Running speed, however, may be the most dominant factor. Physical attributes such as speed, agility and strength are essential to pole vaulting effectively, but technical skill is an equally if not more important element. The object of pole vaulting is to clear a bar or crossbar supported upon two uprights (standards) without knocking it down.

History

Poles were used as a practical means of passing over natural obstacles in marshy places such as the province of Friesland in the Netherlands, along the North Sea, and the great level of the Fens in England across Cambridgeshire, Huntingdonshire, Lincolnshire and Norfolk. Artificial draining of these marshes created a network of open drains or canals intersecting each other. To cross these without getting soaked, while avoiding tedious roundabout journeys over bridges, a stack of jumping poles was kept at every house and used for vaulting over the canals.

Distance pole vaulting competitions continue to be held annually in the lowlands around the North Sea. These far-jumping competitions (Frisian: Fierljeppen) are not based on height.

Other early pole vaulting competitions where height was measured took place at the Ulverston Football and Cricket Club, Lancashire, north of the sands (now Cumbria) in 1843. Modern competition began around 1850 in Germany, when pole vaulting was added to the exercises of the Turner gymnastic clubs by Johann C. F. GutsMuths and Friedrich L. Jahn. In Great Britain, it was first practiced at the Caledonian Games.

Initially, vaulting poles were made from stiff materials such as bamboo or aluminum. The introduction of flexible vaulting poles in the early 1950s made from composites such as fiberglass or carbon fiber allowed vaulters to achieve greater height.

In 2000, IAAF rule 260.18a (formerly 260.6a) was amended, so that "world records" (as opposed to "indoor world records") can be set in a facility "with or without roof". This rule was not applied retroactively. With many indoor facilities not conforming to outdoor track specifications for size and flatness, the pole vault was the only world record set indoors until 2022.

Modern vaulting 

Today, athletes compete in the pole vault as one of the four jumping events in track and field. Because the high jump and pole vault are both vertical jumps, the competitions are conducted similarly. Each athlete can choose at what height they would like to enter the competition. Once they enter, they have three attempts to clear the height. If a height is cleared, the vaulter advances to the next height, where they will have three more attempts. Once the vaulter has three consecutive misses, they are out of the competition and the highest height they cleared is their result. A "no height", often denoted "NH", refers to the failure of a vaulter to clear any bar during the competition.

Once the vaulter enters the competition, they can choose to pass heights. If a vaulter achieves a miss on their first attempt at a height, they can pass to the next height, but they will only have two attempts at that height, as they will be out once they achieve three consecutive misses. Similarly, after earning two misses at a height, they could pass to the next height, when they would have only one attempt.

The competitor who clears the highest height is the winner. If two or more vaulters have finished with the same height, the tie is broken by the number of misses at the final height. If the tied vaulters have the same number of misses at the last height cleared, the tie is broken by the total number of misses in the competition.

If there is still a tie for first place, a jump-off occurs to break the tie. Marks achieved in this type of jump-off are considered valid and count for any purpose that a mark achieved in a normal competition would.

If a tie in the other places still exists, a jump-off is not normally conducted, unless the competition is a qualifying meet, and the tie exists in the final qualifying spot. In this case, an administrative jump-off is conducted to break the tie, but the marks are not considered valid for any other purpose than breaking the tie.

A jump-off is a sudden death competition in which the tied vaulters attempt the same height, starting with the last attempted height. If both vaulters miss, the bar goes down by a small increment, and if both clear, the bar goes up by a small increment. A jump-off ends when one vaulter clears and the other misses. Each vaulter gets one attempt at each height until one makes and one misses.

The equipment and rules for pole vaulting are similar to the high jump. Unlike high jump, however, the athlete in the vault has the ability to select the horizontal position of the bar before each jump and can place it a distance beyond the back of the box, the metal pit that the pole is placed into immediately before takeoff. The range of distance the vaulter may place the standards varies depending on the level of competition.

If the pole used by the athlete dislodges the bar from the uprights, a foul attempt is ruled, even if the athlete has cleared the height. An athlete does not benefit from quickly leaving the landing pad before the bar has fallen. The exception to this rule if the vaulter is vaulting outdoors and has made a clear effort to throw the pole back, but the wind has blown the pole into the bar; this counts as a clearance. This call is made at the discretion of the pole vault official. If the pole breaks during the execution of a vault, it is considered an equipment failure and is ruled a non-jump, neither a make nor a miss. Other types of equipment failure include the standards slipping down or the wind dislodging the bar when no contact was made by the vaulter.

Each athlete has a set amount of time in which to make an attempt. The amount of time varies by level of competition and the number of vaulters remaining. If the vaulter fails to begin an attempt within this time, the vaulter is charged with a time foul and the attempt is a miss.

Poles are manufactured with ratings corresponding to the vaulter's maximum weight. As a safety precaution, some organizations forbid use of poles rated below the vaulter's weight. The recommended weight roughly corresponds to a flex rating that is determined by the manufacturer by applying a standardized amount of stress (most commonly a  weight) on the pole and measuring how much the center of the pole is displaced. Therefore, two poles rated at the same weight are not necessarily the same stiffness.

Pole stiffness and length are important factors to a vaulter's performance. Therefore, it is not uncommon for an elite vaulter to carry as many as ten poles to a competition. The effective length of a pole can be changed by gripping the pole higher or lower in relation to the top of the pole. The left and right handgrips are typically a bit more than shoulder width apart. Each manufacturer determines the weight rating for the pole and the location of the maximum handhold band.

Speed is an essential element to high jumps. The horizontal kinetic energy produced by the run  is converted to vertical propulsion . Assuming no loss of energy , this means that .

Technology
Competitive pole vaulting began using solid ash poles. As the heights attained increased, bamboo poles gave way to tubular aluminum, which was tapered at each end. Today's pole vaulters benefit from poles produced by wrapping pre-cut sheets of fiberglass that contains resin around a metal pole mandrel, to produce a slightly curved pole that bends more easily under the compression caused by an athlete's take-off. The shape of the fiberglass sheets and the amount of fiberglass used is carefully planned to provide the desired length and stiffness of pole. Different fiber types, including carbon-fiber, are used to give poles specific characteristics intended to promote higher jumps. In recent years, carbon fiber has been added to the commonly used E-glass (E for initial electrical use) and S-glass (S for solid) materials to create a lighter pole.

As in the high jump, the landing area was originally a heap of sawdust or sand where athletes landed on their feet. As technology enabled higher vaults, mats evolved into bags of large chunks of foam. They are usually built up with two cross-laid square section logs with gaps between them, topped by a solid layer of foam of the same thickness. This lattice construction is wrapped in a close-fitting cover topped with nylon mesh, which allows some air to escape, thus combining both foam and a measure of air cushioning. The final layer is a large mat of mesh-covered foam which is clipped around the edges of the complete pit and prevents the athlete from falling between the individual bags. Mats are growing larger in area as well to minimize risk of injury. Proper landing technique is on the back or shoulders. Landing on the feet should be avoided, to eliminate the risk of injury to the lower extremities, particularly ankle sprains.

Rule changes over the years have resulted in larger landing areas and additional padding of all hard and unyielding surfaces.

The pole vault crossbar has evolved from a triangular aluminum bar to a round fiberglass bar with rubber ends. This is balanced on standards and can be knocked off when it is hit by a pole vaulter or the pole. Rule changes have led to shorter pegs and crossbar ends that are semi-circular.

Technique

Although many techniques are used by vaulters at various skill levels to clear the bar, the generally accepted technical model can be broken down into several phases.

Approach 
During the approach the pole vaulter sprints down the runway in such a way as to achieve maximum speed and correct position to initiate takeoff at the end of the approach. Top class vaulters use approaches with 18 to 22 strides, often referred to as a "step" in which every other foot is counted as one step. The run-up to the vaulting pit begins forcefully with the vaulter running powerfully in a relaxed, upright position with knees lifted and torso leaning very slightly forward. The head, shoulders and hips are aligned, the vaulter increasing speed as the body becomes erect. The tip of the vaulting pole is angled higher than eye level until three paces from takeoff, when the pole tip descends efficiently, amplifying run speed as the pole is planted into the vault box. The faster the vaulter can run and the more efficient their take-off is, the greater the kinetic energy that can be achieved and used during the vault.

Plant and take-off 
The plant and take-off is initiated typically three steps out from the final step. Vaulters will usually count their steps backwards from their starting point to the box only counting the steps taken on the left foot (vice versa for left-handers) except for the second step from the box, which is taken by the right foot. For example, a vaulter on a "ten count" (referring to the number of counted steps from the starting point to the box) would count backwards from ten, only counting the steps taken with the left foot, until the last three steps taken and both feet are counted as three, two, one. These last three steps are normally quicker than the previous strides and are referred to as the "turn-over". The goal of this phase is to efficiently translate the kinetic energy accumulated from the approach into potential energy stored by the elasticity of the pole, and to gain as much initial vertical height as possible by jumping off the ground. The plant starts with the vaulter raising their arms up from around the hips or mid-torso until they are fully outstretched above the head, with the right arm extended directly above the head and the left arm extended perpendicular to the pole (vice versa for left-handed vaulters). At the same time, the vaulter is dropping the pole tip into the box. On the final step, the vaulter jumps off the trail leg which should always remain straight and then drives the front knee forward. As the pole slides into the back of the box the pole begins to bend and the vaulter continues up and forward, leaving the trail leg angled down and behind.

Swing up 
The swing and row simply consists of the vaulter swinging the trail leg forward and rowing the pole, bringing the top arm down to the hips, while trying to keep the trail leg straight to store more potential energy into the pole, the rowing motion also keeps the pole bent for a longer period of time for the vaulter to get into optimum position. Once in a "U" shape the left arm hugs the pole tight to efficiently use the recoil within the pole. The goal is to carry out these motions as thoroughly and as quickly as possible; it is a race against the unbending of the pole. Effectively, this causes a double pendulum motion, with the top of the pole moving forward and pivoting from the box, while the vaulter acts as a second pendulum pivoting from the right hand. This action gives the vaulter the best position possible to be "ejected" off the pole. The swing continues until the hips are above the head and the arms are pulling the pole close to the chest; from there the vaulter shoots their legs up over the cross bar while keeping the pole close.

Extension 
The extension refers to the extension of the hips upward with outstretched legs as the shoulders drive down, causing the vaulter to be positioned upside down. This position is often referred to as "inversion". While this phase is executed, the pole begins to recoil, propelling the vaulter quickly upward. The hands of the vaulter remain close to the body as they move from the shins back to the region around the hips and upper torso.

Turn 
The turn is executed immediately after or even during the end of the rockback. As the name implies, the vaulter turns 180° toward the pole while extending the arms down past the head and shoulders. Typically the vaulter will begin to angle their body toward the bar as the turn is executed, although ideally the vaulter will remain as vertical as possible. A more accurate description of this phase of the vault may be "the spin" because the vaulter spins around an imaginary axis from head to toe.

Fly-away 
This is often highly emphasized by spectators and novice vaulters, but it is the easiest phase of the vault and is a result of proper execution of previous phases. This phase mainly consists of the vaulter pushing off the pole and releasing it so it falls away from the bar and mats. As the torso goes over and around the bar, the vaulter is facing the bar. Rotation of the body over the bar occurs naturally, and the vaulter's main concern is making sure that their arms, face and any other appendages do not knock the bar off as they go over. The vaulter should land near the middle of the foam landing mats, or pits, face up.

Terminology 

 Bar The cross bar that is suspended above the ground by the standards.
 Box A trapezoidal indentation in the ground with a metal or fiberglass covering at the end of the runway in which vaulters "plant" their pole. The bottom of the box gradually slopes upward approximately  until it is level with the runway. The covering in the box ensures the pole will slide to the back of the box without catching on anything. The covering's lip overlaps onto the runway and ensures a smooth transition from all-weather surface so a pole being planted does not catch on the box.
 Drive knee During the plant phase, the knee is driven forward at the time of "takeoff" to help propel the vaulter upward.
 Grip The location of the vaulter's top hand on the pole. As the vaulter improves, their grip may move up the pole incrementally. The other hand is typically placed shoulder-width down from the top hand. Hands are not allowed to grip the very top of the pole (their hand perpendicular to the pole) for safety reasons.
 Jump foot The foot that the vaulter uses to leave the ground as they begin their vault. It is also referred to as the take-off foot.
 Pit The mats used for landing in pole vault.
 Plant position The position a vaulter is in the moment the pole reaches the back of the box and the vaulter begins their vault. Their arms are fully extended and their drive knee begins to come up as they jump.
 Pole The fiberglass equipment used to propel the vaulter up and over the bar. One side is stiffer than the other to facilitate the bending of the pole after the plant. A vaulter may rest the pole on their arm to determine which side is the stiff side.
 Standards The equipment that holds the bar at a particular height above the ground. Standards may be adjusted to raise and lower the bar and also to adjust the horizontal position of the bar.
 Steps Since the box is in a fixed position, vaulters must adjust their approach to ensure they are in the correct position when attempting to vault.
 Swing leg or trail leg The swing leg is also the jump foot. After a vaulter has left the ground, the leg that was last touching the ground stays extended and swings forward to help propel the vaulter upwards.
 Volzing A method of holding or pushing the bar back onto the pegs while jumping over a height. This takes considerable skill, although it is now against the rules and counted as a miss. The technique is named after U.S. Olympian Dave Volz, who made an art form of the practice and surprised many by making the U.S. Olympic team in 1992.

All-time top 25

.

Men (outdoor)

Women (outdoor)

Men (indoor)

Women (indoor)

Six metres club
The "six metres club" consists of pole vaulters who have reached at least 6.00 metres. In 1985 Sergey Bubka became the first pole vaulter to clear six metres.

Five metres club
Four women have cleared 5 metres. Yelena Isinbayeva was the first to clear  on 22 July 2005. On 2 March 2013, Jennifer Suhr cleared  indoors to become the second. Sandi Morris cleared 5.00 meters on 9 September 2016, to become the third. Anzhelika Sidorova cleared  at the Diamond League final in Zürich on 9 September 2021.

Milestones
This is a list of the first time a milestone mark was cleared.

This is a list of the first-time milestones for women.

Olympic medalists

Men

Women

World Championships medalists

Men

Women

World Indoor Championships medalists

Men

 Known as the World Indoor Games

Women

Season's bests

Men

Women

See also

Notes and references

External links

 IAAF list of pole-vault records in XML
 All-time Masters men's Pole Vault list 
 All-time Masters women's Pole Vault list 

 
Events in track and field
Summer Olympic disciplines in athletics
Jumping sports